University Parkway is a four-lane road that will link the Lloyd Expressway (Indiana 62) and the University of Southern Indiana with Interstate 64

References 

Transportation in Evansville, Indiana
Transportation in Vanderburgh County, Indiana
Roads in Indiana